Suberea is a genus of sponges belonging to the family Aplysinellidae.

The species of this genus are found in Southern Hemisphere.

Species:

Suberea clavata 
Suberea creba 
Suberea elegans 
Suberea etiennei 
Suberea flavolivescens 
Suberea fusca 
Suberea ianthelliformis 
Suberea laboutei 
Suberea meandrina 
Suberea mollis 
Suberea pedunculata 
Suberea praetensa 
Suberea purpureaflava

References

Verongimorpha
Sponge genera